Yitzhak Baer (20 December 1888 – 22 January 1980) was a German-Israeli historian and an expert on medieval Spanish Jewish history.

Early life
Baer was born in Halberstadt in the Prussian Province of Saxony, Germany, in 1888. He studied philosophy, history and classical philology at Berlin University, the University of Strasbourg and the University of Freiburg.

He emigrated to Mandatory Palestine, now Israel, in 1930, and began lecturing on medieval Jewish history at the Hebrew University of Jerusalem. He was professor of medieval history at the University from 1932 to 1945.

Awards
 In 1945, Baer was awarded the Bialik Prize for Jewish thought.
 In 1958, he was awarded the Israel Prize, in Jewish studies.
 In 1968, he received the Yakir Yerushalayim (Worthy Citizen of Jerusalem) award.

Bibliography
 Studien zur Geschichte der Juden im Konigreich Aragonien während des 13. und 14. Jahrhunderts. Berlin: E. Ebering, 1913
 Das Protokollbuch der Landjudenschaft des Herzogtums Kleve. Erster Teil: Die Geschichte des Landjudenschaft Herzogtums Kleve. Berlin: C.A. Schwetschke, 1922
 Untersuchungen über Quellen und Komposition des Schebet Jehuda. Berlin: C.A. Schwetschke, 1923
 Galut'''/ Jizchak Fritz Baer. Berlin: Shocken, 1936
 Land of Israel and Exile to the Medieval Ages. Jerusalem, 1936.
 History of Jews in Christian Spain. Tel Aviv: Am Oved 1945, revised and expanded 1959.
 Peoples of Israel: Studies in the History of the Second Temple Period of the Mishna, the Foundations of Law and Faith.  Jerusalem: Bialik Institute, 1955.
 Exile (translated from German): Israel Eldad, Bialik Institute, Jerusalem, 1980.
 Studies and Essays in the History of Israel'' (in Hebrew), 1985. Jerusalem: Israeli Historical Society, 1985.

See also
 Baer
 List of Bialik Prize recipients
 List of Israel Prize recipients

References

1888 births
1980 deaths
People from Halberstadt
19th-century German Jews
Jewish scholars
Judaic scholars
Jewish historians
Historians of Jews and Judaism
Humboldt University of Berlin alumni
University of Freiburg alumni
University of Strasbourg alumni
Academic staff of the Hebrew University of Jerusalem
Israel Prize in Jewish studies recipients
Members of the Israel Academy of Sciences and Humanities
German emigrants to Mandatory Palestine
20th-century Israeli historians
Israeli medievalists